Henry A. Clemson (1820 – 8 December 1846) was an officer in the United States Navy in the early 19th century.

Life
Born in New Jersey, Clemson was appointed a midshipman in 1836.

Passed midshipman Clemson drowned on 8 December 1846 when Somers capsized off Vera Cruz in a squall while chasing a blockade runner. 

 was named in his honor. 

The Mexican War Midshipmen's Monument was erected at the United States Naval Academy in 1948.  It is in the memory of Clemson and three other midshipmen who died at Vera Cruz. The monument was at one time known as the Clemson Monument.

References

1820 births
1846 deaths
United States Navy personnel of the Mexican–American War
People from New Jersey
United States Navy officers